Sukemasa (written: 亮政, 輔政, 資昌 or 佐理) is a masculine Japanese given name. Notable people with the name include:

 (1491–1546), Japanese samurai and daimyō
 (944–998), Japanese calligrapher
 (1744–1762), Japanese daimyō
 (1849-1867), Japanese kugyō

Japanese masculine given names